Oda Maria Hove Bogstad (born 24 April 1996) is a Norwegian footballer who plays as a goalkeeper for IL Sandviken in the Toppserien.

Life and career
Bogstad started playing football because her dad was a coach and her big sister also played football.

References

External links
 
 

1996 births
Living people
People from Lund, Norway
Norway women's youth international footballers
Norwegian women's footballers
Women's association football goalkeepers
Klepp IL players
Amazon Grimstad players
Lyn Fotball Damer players
Arna-Bjørnar players
SK Brann Kvinner players
2019 FIFA Women's World Cup players
Sportspeople from Rogaland
UEFA Women's Euro 2017 players